Sing and Move (La La La Laaaa) is the second and last single from Banaroo's third album Amazing.  It was released December 30, 2006.

In 2013, Banaroo  released a new version of this song on their fifth studio album "Bubblegum World".

Track listing
Maxi CD
 "Sing and Move (La La La Laaaa)"
 "Sing and Move (La La La Laaaa) (Extended Version)"
 "Sing and Move (La La La Laaaa) (DB-Mix)"
 "Sing and Move (La La La Laaaa) (Instrumental)"

Charts

References

Banaroo songs
2006 singles